Ntare V of Burundi (born Charles Ndizeye; 2 December 1947 – 29 April 1972) was the last king of Burundi (or mwami), reigning from July to November 1966. Until his accession, he was known as Crown Prince Charles Ndizeye.

Early life
Charles Ndizeye was the son of King Mwambutsa IV (1912–1977) and Queen Baramparaye Ruhasha (1929–2007). He had one half-brother (Prince Louis Rwagasore, assassinated 1961 whilst prime minister), and two half-sisters: Princess Rosa Paula Iribagiza (born 1934) and Princess Regina Kanyange (died 1987). Ndizeye was educated at Institut Le Rosey in Switzerland.

Rule

After a Hutu-led coup attempt in October 1965, Mwambutsa IV went into exile in Switzerland. In March 1966, Mwambusta IV designated his only surviving son as heir to the throne. The Crown Prince then formally deposed his father and his father's government in July 1966. He was formally crowned on 3 September, taking the regnal name Ntare V. King Ntare himself was deposed, later the same year, in a military coup led by Michel Micombero; the former king went into exile in West Germany and later Uganda. He tried to return to Burundi in 1972 but was assassinated shortly afterwards.

Execution

Ntare V returned to Burundi in March 1972. Soon afterwards the Hutus began an uprising against the government and established the short-lived state of Martyazo. Ugandan president, Idi Amin, claimed he received a written guarantee from President Micombero that Ntare could return to Burundi and live there as a private citizen. Using the helicopter at his disposal from Amin, Ntare arrived. Within a few hours he was put under house arrest in the former palace in Gitega. Soon after, an official radio broadcast proclaimed that Ntare was trying to instigate a mercenary invasion of Burundi to take back rule. Some ministers favored keeping him under restricted protection in Gitega, while others wanted him dead. The situation was unofficially resolved when Ntare was assassinated sometime between Saturday evening, 29 April, and the following morning, under circumstances which remain unclear.

Whether there was a conspiracy or his death involved with a violent spontaneous outbreak in Gitega has not been determined. Radio Nationale du Burundi (RNB Broadcasting) announced that the king was shot while attempting to escape from the palace where he had been "under arrest". The king's supporters claim he was taken from the Royal Palace and executed by a firing squad before being thrown into a common grave. The king was 24 years old. Meanwhile, the Hutu uprising was quelled by Micombero's forces. Between 80,000 and 210,000 people died in the ensuing war and genocide.

Distinctions

National orders 
  Grand Master of the Royal Order of Prince Louis Rwagasore.
  Grand Master of the Royal Order of Ruzinko (Royal Male Drum).
  Grand Master of the Royal Order of Karyenda (Royal Female Drum).
  Grand Master of the Military Order of Karyenda (Royal Female Drum).

Ancestry

References

External links
Monarchiste

1947 births
1972 deaths
Burundian kings
Leaders who took power by coup
Leaders ousted by a coup
Assassinated Burundian politicians
Deaths by firearm in Burundi
People murdered in Burundi
Alumni of Institut Le Rosey
People who died in the Ikiza